Agapitos Abelas (born 8 March 1975) is a Greek professional football manager and former player.

References

1975 births
Living people
Greek footballers
Diagoras F.C. players
Proodeftiki F.C. players
Kavala F.C. players
Panionios F.C. players
Panachaiki F.C. players
Aris Thessaloniki F.C. players
Rodos F.C. players
Super League Greece players
Greek football managers
GAS Ialysos 1948 F.C. managers
Association football defenders
People from Rhodes
Sportspeople from the South Aegean